The Embassy of Senegal at 39 Marloes Road, Kensington, London, is the diplomatic mission of Senegal in the United Kingdom.

Gallery

References

External links
Official site

Senegal
Diplomatic missions of Senegal
Senegal–United Kingdom relations
Buildings and structures in the Royal Borough of Kensington and Chelsea
South Kensington